Bob Hewitt and Frew McMillan were the defending champions but lost in the final 6–3, 6–7, 6–4 to Victor Pecci and Balázs Taróczy.

Seeds

  Bob Hewitt /  Frew McMillan (final)
  Brian Gottfried /  Stan Smith (first round)
  Victor Pecci /  Balázs Taróczy (champions)
  Jan Kodeš /  Tomáš Šmíd (quarterfinals)

Draw

External links
 1978 Fischer-Grand Prix Doubles draw

Doubles